Čierne Pole is a small village and municipality in Michalovce District in the Kosice Region of eastern Slovakia.

History
In historical records the village was first mentioned in 1422.

Geography
The village lies at an altitude of 108 metres and covers an area of  (2020-06-30/-07-01).

Population 
The municipality has a population of 350 people (2020-12-31).

Genealogical resources

The records for genealogical research are available at the state archive "Statny Archiv in Presov, Slovakia"

 Roman Catholic church records (births/marriages/deaths): 1818-1897 (parish B)

See also
 List of municipalities and towns in Michalovce District
 List of municipalities and towns in Slovakia

References

External links
http://www.statistics.sk/mosmis/eng/run.html
Surnames of living people in Cierne Pole

Villages and municipalities in Michalovce District